Jair Ibrahim Catuy Arosemena (born 28 January 1992) is a Panamanian professional footballer player who plays as a center forward for CD Universitario and the Panama national team.

He debuted internationally on 28 January 2021, in a friendly match against Serbia in a 0–0 draw.

On 25 March 2021, in a 2022 FIFA World Cup qualifying match against Barbados, Catuy scored his first goal for Panama in a 1–0 victory.

Biography

Jair Catuy was born in Panama City on 28 January 1992.

Club career

C.D. Plaza Amador

Catuy made his debut with the Plaza Amador team in the First Division of Panama.

C.A. Independiente

Catuy was signed by C.A. Independiente of La Chorrera in December 2013, to play the 2014 Clausura Tournament.

Santa Gema F.C.

Catuy spend his time with Santa Gema F.C., which was very profitable, as he saw a lot of minutes and scored many goals. He became champion of the 2016–2017 Cup Tournament, and stood out as a promising player of Panamanian soccer.

Chorrillo F.C

At Chorrillo F.C, Catuy played in the 2017 CONCACAF League.

Tauro F.C.

Catuy signed for Tauro F.C. in 2019, played a total of 27 games between the league and international tournaments, scoring 10 goals and becoming champion of two tournaments.

C.D. Universitario

Catuy signed for C.D. Universitario in January 2020, he only played a total of three games before to the tournament being suspended due to the COVID-19 pandemic.

In September 2020, he was loaned for 3 months to San Francisco FC for the Clausura Tournament and the Concacaf League of said semester.

San Francisco FC

He arrived on loan to San Francisco FC for the 2020 Clausura Tournament, and his arrival to the team was announced on September 28. After the tournament and after being runner-up, he returned to his home team the CD Universitario.

Return to C.D. Universitario

On January 7, 2021, his return was announced, this time as a franchise player and his return to training with the team.

International career

He made his debut with the Panamanian senior team on 28 January 2021, in the friendly match against the Serbia at the Rommel Fernández Stadium, in a 0–0 draw.

On 25 March 2021, in a 2022 FIFA World Cup qualifying match against Barbados, Catuy scored his first goal for Panama in a 1–0 victory.

References

External links
 
 

1992 births
Living people
Panamanian footballers
Panama international footballers
Association football forwards
C.D. Plaza Amador players
Atlético Chiriquí players
C.A. Independiente de La Chorrera players
Santa Gema F.C. players
Unión Deportivo Universitario players
Tauro F.C. players
San Francisco F.C. players
Liga Panameña de Fútbol players
Sportspeople from Panama City